Omnibook may refer to:

Charlie Parker Omnibook, a collection of Charlie Parker transcriptions
HP Omnibook, a line of laptop computers by Hewlett Packard
Omnibook Magazine, a publication offering abridgements of best-selling books